Copidognathus is a genus of mites in the family Halacaridae. Copidognathus is a large genus with over 380 accepted species.

Species 
The following species list is adapted from the World Register of Marine Species. Species appearing in other sources are cited to those sources.

A–C 

 Copidognathus abyssiculus Bartsch, 1982
 Copidognathus abyssorum Bartsch, 1982
 Copidognathus acanthophorus Viets, 1950
 Copidognathus acanthoscelus Bartsch, 1992
 Copidognathus acnemus Bartsch, 1986
 Copidognathus acutus Newell, 1947
 Copidognathus adonis Otto, 2001
 Copidognathus adriaticus Viets, 1940
 Copidognathus aenigmatus Otto, 2000
 Copidognathus aequalivestitus Viets, 1950
 Copidognathus africanus Bartsch, 1972
 Copidognathus alvinus Bartsch, 1994
 Copidognathus amalus Bartsch, 1999
 Copidognathus amaurus Bartsch, 1999
 Copidognathus americanus Bartsch, 1979
 Copidognathus ampliatus Bartsch, 1994
 Copidognathus andamanensis Chatterjee & De Troch, 2003
 Copidognathus andhraensis Chatterjee, Annapurna & Chang, 2004
 Copidognathus angulipes Newell, 1984
 Copidognathus angusticeps Bartsch, 2007
 Copidognathus angustus Viets, 1936
 Copidognathus anops Newell, 1971 
 Copidognathus arabicus Chatterjee & Chang, 2004
 Copidognathus arcticus Sokolov, 1946
 Copidognathus arcuatus Newell, 1984
 Copidognathus areolatus Bartsch, 1989
 Copidognathus aricae Newell, 1984
 Copidognathus arnaudi Newell, 1984
 Copidognathus asketus Otto, 2000
 Copidognathus asperatus Newell, 1984
 Copidognathus atlanticus Bartsch, 1982
 Copidognathus attalus Bartsch, 1999
 Copidognathus aurorae Newell, 1951
 Copidognathus australensis (Lohmann, 1909)
 Copidognathus bairdi Newell, 1947
 Copidognathus bairdiensis Bartsch, 1984
 Copidognathus balakrishnani Chatterjee, 2000
 Copidognathus barrierensis Otto, 2001
 Copidognathus basidentatus (Trouessart, 1899)
 Copidognathus bavayi (Trouessart, 1896)
 Copidognathus bengalensis Chatterjee, Annapurna & Chang, 2003
 Copidognathus bermudensis Bartsch & Iliffe, 1985
 Copidognathus biodomus Bartsch, 1997
 Copidognathus biscayneus Newell, 1947
 Copidognathus bispinus Bartsch, 1994
 Copidognathus bistriatus Bartsch, 1994
 Copidognathus bituberosus Newell, 1971
 Copidognathus boraeus Bartsch, 1992
 Copidognathus borealis Makarova, 1978
 Copidognathus brachyrhynchus André, 1959
 Copidognathus brachystomus Viets, 1940
 Copidognathus brevimaxillaris Newell, 1951
 Copidognathus brevipes Viets, 1940
 Copidognathus brevirostris Viets, 1927
 Copidognathus brifacius Bartsch, 1989
 Copidognathus bruneiensis Chatterjee, Marshall & Pešić, 2012
 Copidognathus bruuni Newell, 1967
 Copidognathus bunofer Bartsch, 1984
 Copidognathus caelatus Bartsch, 1994
 Copidognathus calidictyotus Bartsch & Rybakova, 2015
 Copidognathus caloglossae Proches, 2002
 Copidognathus canaliculifer Bartsch, 1994
 Copidognathus cataphractus (Trouessart, 1899)
 Copidognathus caudani (Trouessart, 1896)
 Copidognathus caudatus Newell, 1947
 Copidognathus caulifer (Trouessart, 1899)
 Copidognathus celatus Bartsch, 1979
 Copidognathus cephalocanthus Bartsch, 1992
 Copidognathus cerberoideus Bartsch, 1991
 Copidognathus chilensis Newell, 1984
 Copidognathus coalescens Newell, 1984
 Copidognathus commatops Newell, 1984
 Copidognathus confusus Newell, 1984
 Copidognathus consobrinus Bartsch, 1991
 Copidognathus cooki Bartsch, 2003
 Copidognathus corallicolus Chatterjee, De Troch & Chang, 2006
 Copidognathus corallorum (Trouessart, 1899)
 Copidognathus corneatus Newell, 1971
 Copidognathus coronatus Makarova, 1972
 Copidognathus costipora Newell, 1984
 Copidognathus crassirostris (Trouessart, 1901)
 Copidognathus crassispinus Bartsch, 1994
 Copidognathus cribellus Bartsch, 1993
 Copidognathus cribosoma (Police, 1909)
 Copidognathus cristatus Viets, 1936
 Copidognathus crusoei Newell, 1971
 Copidognathus crypticus Newell, 1984
 Copidognathus culoatus Bartsch, 1999
 Copidognathus cumberlandi Newell, 1971
 Copidognathus curassaviensis Viets, 1936
 Copidognathus curiosus Bartsch, 1982
 Copidognathus curtus Hall, 1912

D–F 

 Copidognathus dactyloporus Benfatti, Mari & Morselli, 1989
 Copidognathus daguilarensis Bartsch, 1997
 Copidognathus dentatus Viets, 1940
 Copidognathus dentipes Bartsch, 1989
 Copidognathus derjugini Sokolov, 1952
 Copidognathus dianae Newell, 1951
 Copidognathus diaphaneus Newell, 1951
 Copidognathus dictyotellus Bartsch, 1998
 Copidognathus dictyotus Bartsch, 1993
 Copidognathus dissimilis Bartsch, 2013
 Copidognathus ditadii Pepato & Tiago, 2005
 Copidognathus dubiosus Bartsch, 1994
 Copidognathus eblingi Chatterjee, 1991
 Copidognathus elaboratus Bartsch, 1997
 Copidognathus elongatus Sokolov, 1952
 Copidognathus emblematus Otto, 2001
 Copidognathus euryalus Bartsch, 1997
 Copidognathus extensus Viets, 1940
 Copidognathus fabricii (Lohmann, 1889)
 Copidognathus facetus Bartsch, 1999
 Copidognathus falcifer Viets, 1940
 Copidognathus faubeli Bartsch, 1986
 Copidognathus felicis Newell, 1971
 Copidognathus fernandezi Newell, 1971
 Copidognathus festivus Bartsch, 1984
 Copidognathus ficipacus Bartsch, 1992
 Copidognathus figeus Bartsch, 1976
 Copidognathus fistulosus Chatterjee & Chang, 2005
 Copidognathus floridensis Newell, 1947
 Copidognathus floridus Trouessart, 1914
 Copidognathus foveatellus Bartsch, 1997
 Copidognathus foveolatus Newell, 1984
 Copidognathus frondipes Newell, 1984
 Copidognathus frontispinus Bartsch, 1972
 Copidognathus fungiae Chatterjee, De Troch & Chang, 2006
 Copidognathus fungiformis Makarova, 1974

G–I 

 Copidognathus ganglionatus Newell, 1984
 Copidognathus gasconi (Gil & Garzon, 1979)
 Copidognathus gazii Chatterjee & De Troch, 2000
 Copidognathus gibberipes Viets, 1936
 Copidognathus gibboides Bartsch, 1977
 Copidognathus gibbus (Trouessart, 1889)
 Copidognathus gigas Newell, 1951
 Copidognathus gitae Chatterjee, 1991
 Copidognathus glandulifer Bartsch, 1996
 Copidognathus glandulosus Bartsch, 1984
 Copidognathus glareus Newell, 1984
 Copidognathus globulosus Makarova, 1974
 Copidognathus glyptoderma (Trouessart, 1888)
 Copidognathus gorbunovi Sokolov, 1946
 Copidognathus gracilipalpis Sokolov, 1952
 Copidognathus gracilis Viets, 1936
 Copidognathus gracilunguis Bartsch, 1992
 Copidognathus grandiculus Bartsch, 1977
 Copidognathus grandiosus Bartsch, 1984
 Copidognathus granosus Newell, 1984
 Copidognathus granulatus (Hodge, 1863)
 Copidognathus graveolus (Monniot F., 1962)
 Copidognathus greeni Chatterjee, 1999
 Copidognathus gulatus Newell, 1984
 Copidognathus gurjanovae Sokolov, 1952
 Copidognathus gurui Chatterjee & Pesic, 2014
 Copidognathus guttatus Bartsch, 1977
 Copidognathus hartmanni Bartsch, 1972
 Copidognathus hartwigi Bartsch, 1979
 Copidognathus hawaiiensis Bartsch, 1989
 Copidognathus hephaestios Benfatti, Mari & Morselli, 1992
 Copidognathus humerosus (Trouessart, 1896)
 Copidognathus hummelincki Viets, 1936
 Copidognathus hureaui Newell, 1984
 Copidognathus hylandi Bartsch, 1979
 Copidognathus ilsebartschi MacQuitty, 1984
 Copidognathus imitator Newell, 1951
 Copidognathus incarinatus Newell, 1984
 Copidognathus inconspicuus Bartsch, 1991
 Copidognathus infaustus Makarova, 1972
 Copidognathus inflatus Makarova, 1977
 Copidognathus inflexus Viets, 1952
 Copidognathus intermedius Makarova, 1977
 Copidognathus inusitatus Bartsch, 1989
 Copidognathus isopunctatus Bartsch, 1972
 Copidognathus ivanomorsellii Chatterjee & De Troch, 2003

J–L 

 Copidognathus jejuensis Chatterjee & Chang, 2004
 Copidognathus johnstoni (Womersley, 1937)
 Copidognathus kagamili Newell, 1950
 Copidognathus kenyae Chatterjee & DeTroch, 2000
 Copidognathus keralensis Chatterjee, 2000
 Copidognathus kerguelensis (Lohmann, 1907)
 Copidognathus koreanus Chatterjee & Chang, 2003
 Copidognathus krantzi Chatterjee, 1992
 Copidognathus kurilensis Makarova, 1972
 Copidognathus kussakini Makarova, 1972
 Copidognathus laevisetosus Chatterjee, Lee & Chang, 2004
 Copidognathus laeviusculus Bartsch, 1993
 Copidognathus lamelliger Sokolov, 1952
 Copidognathus lamelloides Bartsch, 2000
 Copidognathus lamellosus (Lohmann, 1893)
 Copidognathus laminifer Bartsch, 1994
 Copidognathus latisetus Viets, 1940
 Copidognathus latus Viets, 1927
 Copidognathus latusculus Bartsch, 2015
 Copidognathus leiodermus Bartsch, 2004
 Copidognathus lepidoides Bartsch, 1984
 Copidognathus lepidus Bartsch, 1977
 Copidognathus leptoporus Otto, 2001
 Copidognathus leptus Bartsch, 2002
 Copidognathus levigatus Bartsch, 1999
 Copidognathus libiniensis Pepato, Santos & Tiago, 2005
 Copidognathus lineatus Bartsch, 1977
 Copidognathus lobifrons Viets, 1951
 Copidognathus lohmanni (Trouessart, 1889)
 Copidognathus longipes Bartsch, 1973
 Copidognathus longirostris (Trouessart, 1896)
 Copidognathus longispinus Bartsch & Iliffe, 1985
 Copidognathus longiunguis Bartsch, 1990
 Copidognathus loricatus (Lohmann, 1889)
 Copidognathus loricifer André, 1946
 Copidognathus lubricus Bartsch, 1986
 Copidognathus lunatus Newell, 1984
 Copidognathus lutarius Bartsch, 2003

M–N 

 Copidognathus macropus Bartsch, 2009
 Copidognathus mactanus Bartsch, 1985
 Copidognathus maculatus Bartsch, 1979
 Copidognathus magnipalpus (Police, 1909)
 Copidognathus magniporus Bartsch, 1973
 Copidognathus majorinus Bartsch, 1993
 Copidognathus majusculus (Trouessart, 1894)
 Copidognathus malaysius Bartsch, 1993
 Copidognathus mangrovorum Chatterjee, Marshall & Pešić, 2012
 Copidognathus manicatus (Trouessart, 1899)
 Copidognathus manubriatus Viets, 1936
 Copidognathus marcandrei Viets, 1950
 Copidognathus matemwensis Chatterjee, De Troch & Chan, 2008
 Copidognathus matthewsi Newell, 1956
 Copidognathus megaloporus Otto, 2001
 Copidognathus menippensis Pepato, Santos & Tiago, 2005
 Copidognathus meridianus Bartsch, 2003
 Copidognathus mesomorphus André, 1959
 Copidognathus milliporus Bartsch, 1984
 Copidognathus mirus Bartsch, 1984
 Copidognathus modestus Bartsch, 1984
 Copidognathus mollis Bartsch, 2015
 Copidognathus monacanthus Bartsch, 1992
 Copidognathus mucronatus Viets, 1928
 Copidognathus multiporus Bartsch, 1994
 Copidognathus mumbaiensis Chatterjee & Chang, 2004
 Copidognathus nasutus Bartsch, 1994
 Copidognathus nautilei Bartsch, 1997
 Copidognathus nemenus Bartsch, 1984
 Copidognathus neotrichius Newell, 1984
 Copidognathus neptuneus Bartsch, 1992
 Copidognathus newelli  Viets, 1956
 Copidognathus novus Bartsch, 1980
 Copidognathus nubilobius Newell, 1951
 Copidognathus obesus Bartsch, 1984
 Copidognathus oblongus Newell, 1984
 Copidognathus obsoletus André, 1938
 Copidognathus occultans Bartsch, 1991
 Copidognathus oculatus (Hodge, 1863)
 Copidognathus orarius Otto, 2001
 Copidognathus orbicularis Makarova, 1974
 Copidognathus orientalis Newell, 1951
 Copidognathus ornatus Bartsch, 1981
 Copidognathus oxianus Viets, 1928

P–R 

 Copidognathus pachypus Newell, 1947
 Copidognathus pacificus Makarova, 1974
 Copidognathus paluster Bartsch, 1991
 Copidognathus papillatus Krantz, 1982
 Copidognathus parallelus (Trouessart, 1899)
 Copidognathus parapunctatus Newell, 1950
 Copidognathus parvulus Bartsch, 2007
 Copidognathus pasticus Newell, 1971
 Copidognathus pauciporus Bartsch, 1977
 Copidognathus pectinatus Newell, 1984
 Copidognathus peregrinus Bartsch, 1977
 Copidognathus pesident Bartsch, 1992
 Copidognathus philippinensis Chatterjee & De Troch, 2003
 Copidognathus piger Bartsch, 2003
 Copidognathus planus Makarova, 1974
 Copidognathus polyporus Bartsch, 1991
 Copidognathus pontellus Bartsch, 1981
 Copidognathus ponteuxinus Viets, 1928
 Copidognathus poriferus Bartsch, 1979
 Copidognathus porosus Newell, 1984
 Copidognathus posticenodosus Viets, 1951
 Copidognathus posticus Newell, 1971
 Copidognathus poucheti (Trouessart, 1893)
 Copidognathus prideauxae Otto, 2001
 Copidognathus procerus Bartsch, 2002
 Copidognathus profundus (Viets, 1936)
 Copidognathus prolixus Newell, 1984
 Copidognathus propinquus Newell, 1951
 Copidognathus psammobius Bartsch, 2008
 Copidognathus pseudofigeus Bartsch, 1977
 Copidognathus pseudosetosus Newell, 1949
 Copidognathus pseudosidellus Chatterjee, 1997
 Copidognathus pujadus Chatterjee & De Troch, 2003
 Copidognathus pulchellus (Sokolov, 1952)
 Copidognathus pulcher (Lohmann, 1893)
 Copidognathus pumicatus Bartsch, 1999
 Copidognathus punctatissimus (Gimbel, 1919)
 Copidognathus punctatus Newell, 1950
 Copidognathus punctellus Bartsch, 1994
 Copidognathus pygmaeus Bartsch, 1980
 Copidognathus quadratus Makarova, 1972
 Copidognathus quadricostatus (Trouessart, 1894)
 Copidognathus quadriporosus Chatterjee & Chang, 2006
 Copidognathus raekor Bartsch, 1973
 Copidognathus rasilis Bartsch, 1999
 Copidognathus remipes (Trouessart, 1894)
 Copidognathus reticulatus (Trouessart, 1893)
 Copidognathus rhodostigma (Gosse, 1855)
 Copidognathus rhombognathoides Bartsch, 2006
 Copidognathus richardi (Trouessart, 1902)
 Copidognathus riguus Bartsch, 2015
 Copidognathus rombus Makarova, 1978
 Copidognathus rostatellus Bartsch, 1986
 Copidognathus rostratus (Trouessart, 1899)

S–U 

 Copidognathus sambhui Chatterjee, 1991
 Copidognathus scitus Bartsch, 1977
 Copidognathus sculptus (Police, 1909)
 Copidognathus scuna Otto, 1994
 Copidognathus scutellus Bartsch, 1995
 Copidognathus seductus Otto, 2000
 Copidognathus semilunatus Newell, 1984
 Copidognathus septentrionalis (Halbert, 1915)
 Copidognathus setilatus Bartsch, 2001
 Copidognathus sidellus Bartsch, 1985
 Copidognathus sideus Bartsch, 1982
 Copidognathus sigillatus Newell, 1984
 Copidognathus similis Newell, 1951
 Copidognathus simonis (Lohmann, 1907)
 Copidognathus simplipes Newell, 1984
 Copidognathus sinuosus Newell, 1971
 Copidognathus sophiae Pepato & Tiago, 2006
 Copidognathus speciosus (Lohmann, 1893)
 Copidognathus spinifer MacQuitty, 1984
 Copidognathus spinula (Trouessart, 1899)
 Copidognathus squarrosus Otto, 2000
 Copidognathus stevcici Bartsch, 1976
 Copidognathus strictulus Bartsch, 1997
 Copidognathus strigellus Bartsch, 1994
 Copidognathus styracifer Newell, 1951
 Copidognathus subgibbus Newell, 1971
 Copidognathus subneotrichius Newell, 1984
 Copidognathus subterraneus Bartsch & Iliffe, 1985
 Copidognathus suezensis André, 1959
 Copidognathus tabellio (Trouessart, 1894)
 Copidognathus tamoiorum Pepato & Tiago, 2005
 Copidognathus tectiporus (Viets, 1935)
 Copidognathus tectirostris Bartsch, 1979
 Copidognathus temaeus Bartsch, 1992
 Copidognathus tenuirostris Bartsch, 1977
 Copidognathus tetrarhachis Chatterjee & Chang, 2006
 Copidognathus thailandicus Chatterjee & Chang, 2002
 Copidognathus thomasi Newell, 1950
 Copidognathus thompsoni Otto, 2000
 Copidognathus transversus Newell, 1984
 Copidognathus triareolatus Newell, 1984
 Copidognathus tricorneatus (Viets, 1938)
 Copidognathus tridentatus Viets, 1951
 Copidognathus triops Viets, 1936
 Copidognathus triton Newell, 1971
 Copidognathus tritoni Bartsch, 2013
 Copidognathus trouessarti (Voinov, 1896)
 Copidognathus tuberans Newell, 1984
 Copidognathus tuberipes Bartsch, 1977
 Copidognathus tupinamborum Pepato & Tiago, 2006
 Copidognathus umbonatus Bartsch, 1992
 Copidognathus unalaskensis Newell, 1951
 Copidognathus ungujaensis Chatterjee, De Troch & Chang, 2006
 Copidognathus uniareolatus Newell, 1971
 Copidognathus uniscutatus Bartsch, 1984
 Copidognathus unispinosus Bartsch, 1989
 Copidognathus ushakovi Sokolov, 1952

V–Z 

 Copidognathus vagus Makarova, 1977
 Copidognathus vanhoeffeni (Lohmann, 1907)
 Copidognathus ventriscutatus Bartsch, 1989
 Copidognathus venustus Bartsch, 1977
 Copidognathus vicinus Bartsch, 1997
 Copidognathus viridulus Bartsch, 2009
 Copidognathus vulcanis Newell, 1951
 Copidognathus vulgaris Bartsch, 1998
 Copidognathus wadjemupis Bartsch, 1999
 Copidognathus waltairensis Chatterjee & Annapurna, 2002
 Copidognathus xaixaiensis Proches, 2002
 Copidognathus ypsilophorus Newell, 1984
 Copidognathus yucatanensis Chatterjee & DeTroch, 2001
 Copidognathus zanzibari (Gimbel, 1919)

References

Trombidiformes genera
Animals described in 1888